Whitmell is a given name. Notable people with the name include:

Whitmell Hill (1743–1797), American planter from Martin County, North Carolina
Whitmell P. Martin (1867–1929), U.S. Representative from Louisiana
Whitmell P. Tunstall (1810–1854), lawyer and state legislator in Chatham, Virginia

See also
Whitmell, Virginia, unincorporated community in Pittsylvania County, in the U.S. state of Virginia